Star's Lover (also known as Celebrity's Sweetheart) is a 2008 South Korean television series starring Choi Ji-woo and Yoo Ji-tae that aired on SBS. A love story between a star actress and an ordinary man, director Boo Sung-chul said the series was inspired by the 1999 film Notting Hill.

Plot 
Lee Ma-ri (Choi Ji-woo) is a top star in South Korea and throughout Asia. The head of her management agency, Seo Tae-suk (Sung Ji-ru), hires a ghostwriter to help transform Ma-ri's image. Poverty-stricken university lecturer Kim Chul-soo (Yoo Ji-tae) takes the job in order to earn money to repay his ex-girl friend, who paid for his college tuition. Whilst they are in Japan he falls in love with Ma-ri. However, when the travel essay book Lovers in Asuka, written by Chul-soo on Ma-ri's behalf, becomes a bestseller, Ma-ri gets caught up in the controversy generated by the ghost writing. The two lovers try to continue their relationship away from media attention, but obstacles abound: eligible young executive Jung Woo-jin (Lee Ki-woo), who pursues Ma-ri; Ma-ri's first love Kang Woo-jin (Choi Phillip), who suddenly vanished from her life; Chul-soo's ex-girlfriend Choi Eun-young (Cha Ye-ryun); and the manipulative Seo Tae-suk, who seeks to control everything in Ma-ri's life.

Cast

Main characters
Choi Ji-woo: Lee Ma-ri
Jung Da-bin: young Ma-ri
Yoo Ji-tae: Kim Chul-soo
Kang Yi-seok: young Chul-soo
Lee Ki-woo: Jung Woo-jin
Cha Ye-ryun: Choi Eun-young

Supporting characters
Park Bo-young: Young Lee Ma-ri (cameo)
Sung Ji-ru: Seo Tae-suk, CEO of Ma-ri's management agency
Ki Tae-young: Son Ha-young
Choi Phillip: Kang Woo-jin
Lee Joon-hyuk: Min Jang-soo, Ma-ri's bodyguard
Jung In-seo: In-seo	
Yang Hee-kyung: Lee Seung-yeon, Ma-ri's stylist
Shin Min-hee: Kim Yu-ri, Chul-soo's sister
Jung Woon-taek: Jun Byung-joon
Shim Eun-jin: Ye-rin
Ban Hyo-jung: Ma-ri's grandmother
Kwak Hyun-hwa: Lee Eun-sil
Lee Seung-hyung: Choi Seung-wook
Yoon Joo-sang: Professor Ahn
Lee Jong-nam: Choi Ryun-hee
Kim Ji-young: Kim Ok-ja
Kim Ye-ryeong: Lee Ji-soon
Kim Ji-sook: Bo-young, Chul-soo's mother
Bae Ki-bum: Chul-soo's father
Lee Young-eun: student (cameo, ep 1)
Gong Hyung-jin: Hong Kong movie director (cameo, ep 1)
Shin Hyun-joon: department store magnate (cameo, ep 1)
Kim Ji-seok : actor (cameo, ep 1)
Ji Jin-hee: actor, Ma-ri's ex-boyfriend (cameo, ep 8)
Lee Dong-gun: Eun-young's friend (cameo, ep 20)
Min Joon-hyun: entertainment journalist
Song Young-kyu

Ratings

Source: TNS Media Korea

Production
As of the twelfth episode Choi was reported to have worn 147 outfits, thus averaging 12 ensembles per episode, with episode two alone featuring 25 different outfits. The sheer volume of clothing and range of styles is in line with her character as a top actress.

Many of the scenes were filmed on location in Seoul and Busan.
 Episode 20: Ilsan Lake Park, Janghang-dong, Ilsan district, Goyang city, Gyeonggi Province.
 Episode 8 and 19: Il Mare, an Italian restaurant, located in front of Ilsan Lake Park.
 Seoul National University: the university of Chul-soo's employment, his lectures and Ma-ri's visit to the school were filmed at the gallery, Gyujanggak, and museum roads. This is the first time the university allowed its campus to be used as a filming location.
 Haeundae Beach and Dongbaek Island, Busan: The scene where Ma-ri confesses her love for Chul-soo and the couple takes a walk on the beach.

International broadcast
It first aired in Japan on satellite channel WOWOW beginning May 1, 2009. Reruns followed on terrestrial network TBS from September 27 to October 22, 2010, and on cable channel KNTV from November 9 to December 4, 2009.

In Thailand it first aired on Modernine TV in 2011.

References

External links
 Star's Lover official SBS website 
 Celebrity's Sweetheart at  SBS Global
 

Seoul Broadcasting System television dramas
2008 South Korean television series debuts
2009 South Korean television series endings
Korean-language television shows
South Korean romance television series
Television shows set in Nara Prefecture